Cody Andrew Miller III (born July 30, 1971), known professionally as Troy Montero, is a Filipino-American actor.

He was born to an American father of German and Irish ancestry, and a U.S.-born Filipina mother.  In 2008, he and girlfriend Aubrey Miles had a baby boy named Hunter at St. Luke's Medical Center Quezon City. and his daughter Rocket Miller in December 14, 2018.

Montero is the brother of KC Montero and Colby Miller.

Filmography

Television
 Huwag Kang Mangamba (2021) TBA (Kapamilya Channel)
 Wattpad Presents: Captivated by Tyrone Greene (2017) Sebastian Greene (TV5)
 A Love to Last (2017) Michael (ABS-CBN)
 A1 Ko Sa 'Yo (2016) Ken (GMA Network)
 Karelasyon (2016) (GMA Network)
 Wagas (2016) Dr. Rob (GMA Network)
 Kailangan Ko'y Ikaw (2013) Aldrich (ABS-CBN)
 Talentadong Pinoy (2010) guest judge  (TV5)
 Dog TV (2010) guest  (Solar TV)
 Showtime (2010) guest judge {hurado} (ABS-CBN)
 Front Act (2008) guest (TV5)
 Auto Extreme (2005) guest  (Solar TV)
 Sa Dulo Ng Walang Hanggan (2001) Hector Soriano (ABS-CBN)
 Dear Mikee (2000) guest  (GMA Network)
 Keep on Dancing (1998–2000)

Movies
 El Presidente (2012) Frederick Funston 
 Binibining K (2006) Will
 Super B (2002) Edgar
 Eto Na Naman Ako (2000) Vince Madrigal
 Dito Sa Puso Ko (1999) Rams
 Bakit Pa? (1999) Bryan
 Delivered (1998)
 Empleyada (1998) (TV)

Notes

References

External links

1971 births
Living people
20th-century Filipino male actors
Filipino male television actors
American male actors of Filipino descent
Filipino television personalities
American people of Irish descent
American people of German descent
American emigrants to the Philippines
21st-century Filipino male actors
Filipino male film actors
ABS-CBN personalities
GMA Network personalities
TV5 (Philippine TV network) personalities